Ernophthora phoenicias is a species of snout moth in the genus Ernophthora. It was described by Edward Meyrick in 1887, and is known from Australia.

References

Moths described in 1887
Cabniini